Bhalchandra Yadava (1 July, 1958 - 4 October, 2019) was a twice elected Indian politician and Member of Parliament Khalilabad (Lok Sabha constituency) in Uttar Pradesh.

References

External links
 Official biographical sketch in Parliament of India website

1958 births
2019 deaths
People from Uttar Pradesh
People from Basti
People from Sant Kabir Nagar district
India MPs 2004–2009
Bahujan Samaj Party politicians from Uttar Pradesh